Keith Lee Barnhart (born October 6, 1962) is an American composer, keyboardist, and audio engineer commonly referred to as "Plex". Although most of his credits are as a session musician on nearly 100 major label albums, most of his career earnings came from composing for: TV & Radio, library music, and popular song.

Life and career

Early life and education
Barnhart was born and raised in Huntington, West Virginia to adoptive parents. He has one son, Byron (born 1996) from a previous marriage. His parents put a piano in his bedroom at age 5 and by age 7 he was performing Beethoven by ear. By age 8 he was performing in local talent contests. In elementary school, he was part-time accompanist and tuned the guitars and auto-harps for the class. The music teacher, Caroline Gillespie (married to big-band conductor Mel Gillespie) fostered Barnhart's abilities and got him an audition, at the age of 10, to study with Marshall University music professor Paul Jennings who made an exception in taking Barnhart on as a student. For five years Barnhart studied theory, improvisation, electronic music and was exposed to a wide variety of progressive music.

Early career
At age 16 Barnhart dropped out of high school to tour with a funk-band, "110 Degrees In The Shade, returning to graduate with his class. He was immediately to be the musical director of a Neil Diamond-Revue in Arlington, TX and at 17 went to Nashville to tour with an Elvis impersonator. 1n 1980 he was accepted to the Berklee College of Music in Boston, to study piano and electronic music. He performed lead in the last theatrical play performed there (Tom Stoppard’s Dirty Linens) and quickly rose in ranks within the school. Plex attended 12 semesters, expanding his studies in different fields, was offered a department chair upon his graduation and returned years later for guest lectures. Among his many performances in the Berklee Performance Center was most noticeably the first-ever ALL electronic concert given in 1983, where his talents were discovered by fellow student Joe Mardin, who brought Barnhart to Manhattan to meet his father, legendary producer and Atlantic Records VP [Arif Mardin], for the purpose of working on a demo for Chaka Khan's upcoming album I Feel For You. The demo tracks were strong enough on their own to be accepted onto the final album mix. In 1985 he traveled to Montréal, Quebec to produce, program, and arrange the debut album for Marie Denise Pelletier, an artist for he also composed. Immediately after this project Barnhart moved to Manhattan where is career quickly took flight. He would remain there for 15 years.

Career
Manhattan was very kind to Barnhart during the late 80s and the 90s; within the 1st month of arriving he was recording and touring with Melanie, and penning charts for legendary drummer Steve Ferone. His first recording session was in Steely Dan's Riverside studio. He began his internship in Times Square's Unique Recording Studio where he quickly established himself as the house programmer and keyboardist, and part-time engineer, which peaked as assistant engineering for Quincy Jones on a Roberta Flack track. His quick success enabled free-lance capacity where he still remains. Remix credits: Janet Jackson's "The Pleasure Principle". Remixes with Kurtis Khaleel AKA Mantronik.: Herb Alpert, Nu Shooz, Joyce Simms, The Caine Gang, Duran Duran, and Sequal.

Arif Mardin often called upon Plex for his services recording with Dionne Warwick, Bette Midler, EQ, and Roberta Flack. 
Roger Talkov, a Hit Factory engineer, introduced him to Keith Richards, Brian Wilson, Paul Simon, Phil Ramone, Elliot Easton, and Kim Turner (Sting's manager) all of which Plex provide various services.

Plex also performed many remixes with producer/ DJ Freddie Bastone for such acts as Yello, Vanessa Williams, Jamiroquai, and Savage Garden. Bastone and Plex fused their names to become the act Plexstone that got signed to the indie label Cutting Records, as a dance act that got distributed in South America.

Barnhart also produced the failed single "Chicago Nights" for the Village People.

Plex has received 9 RIAA certified Gold and Platinum albums for his role as keyboardists and synthesizer programmer.

NYC Club Scene and live performances

Manhattan's live-music scene was very helpful to many musicians during the 80s-90s. If one could successfully network in the venues and events, then work would most likely be proffered.
 During this time Plex performed live with Chaka Khan, John Entwistle, Mitch Mitchell, Steve Winwood, Richie Sambora, Billy Squier, Phoebe Snow, All-4-One, along with many of NYC A-list musicians. It was at the famed China Club where Plex caught the interest of David Bowie’s musical director and guitarist Carlos Alomar who quickly pulled him in for the Debbie Gibson world tour. The tour got cut short due to poor record sales and the Gulf War which broke out the same night Plex performed in front of 200,000 fans in Rio de Janeiro, Brazil. With Gibson, he also had a performance on The Arsenio Hall Show, and ad work. He played keyboards in two MTV videos: Sweet Sensation's "Sincerely Yours" in the Apollo Theater, and Debbie Gibson's "This So-called Miracle" in a Hollywood studio.

Barnhart unsuccessfully auditioned for Scritti Politti (the tour never happened) and Lenny Kravitz.

Publishing and composing
In the early 90s Barnhart diversified his talents to writing. His work with veteran composer Charles Morrow and production house owner Michael Rubin landed him composing work on the AT&T True Voice campaign with Whitney Houston, Playtex, Nestles, and Post Cereals. In 1990 Plex began composing ads for Macy's National with producer John Wonderling (Bay City Rollers and Allan Toussaint), a working relationship that lasted over 12 years. Plex also was a freelance composer and studio musician for many other commercial productions. In 1992 Barnhart began composing for music libraries, most notably Aircraft that used his works in hundreds of different productions. His composing skills were utilized on the feature film bonus material for the movie Tooth Fairy. His songwriting highlight was his co-writing of the hit single "Seems Your Much Too Busy" with R&B singer Angie Stone for her band Vertical Hold, which topped the Billboard R&B aired single chart. He penned a single in Canada for Marie Denise Pelletier, and three songs for Lebanese superstar Lydia Canaan. Earlier this decade Plex was invited to submit cues from his personal library for syndicated TV shows: America's Most Wanted, Greatest American Hero, 21 Jump Street, Hunter, and The Commish. In  2010 he was the primary composer for the VH-1 show You're Cut Off! which has been renewed for 2011. In 2013 his cues are being used for the show Redneck Island.

To date, Plex has been a member of ASCAP for over 30 years, and erstwhile voting member of NARAS (Grammy Awards) for over a decade. His compositions have grossed nearly $3,000,000 in royalties. He currently resides in Huntington, West Virginia owning the recording studio and music production facility The MusicPlex.

References

External links

American male composers
21st-century American composers
American keyboardists
1962 births
Living people
21st-century American male musicians